"Stay on These Roads" is a song by Norwegian band A-ha, released on 14 March 1988 as the lead single from their third studio album of the same name (1988). It achieved success in many European countries.

Release and reception
"Stay on These Roads" was released in the spring of 1988 and became the most successful single from the Stay on These Roads album, along with "The Living Daylights" on the UK charts. The song did not hit the national charts in the United States, but was a significant hit across Europe. It went to number seven in Germany, number three in France and Iceland, and number two in Ireland. In Norway, the song was the band's fourth number one single. "Stay on These Roads" was A-ha's seventh and final top five showing in the United Kingdom, reaching number five on the chart edition of March 27, 1988. It would also prove their last top ten hit in the country for almost two decades, as they did not score another UK top ten hit until eighteen years later in 2006.

A Roland D-50 was used on this song—the sound patch is called "Staccato Heaven"—the wind sound during the instrumental was made on either a Roland Juno 60 or Juno 106 synthesizer.

The versions on the 7" vinyl and the 3" CD single ("7 inch Version") are identical to the album version. The 7" single cover montage includes a blurred picture of actress Susan Sullivan, taken from a publicity shot from the TV series, Falcon Crest, in which she appeared as Maggie Gioberti. It is not known why this picture is used.

Cash Box said that "ethereal, arching vocals elevate this ballad into greatness, creating a mood that does not easily leave you." Jerry Smith of Music Week considered "Stay on These Roads" as "one of their typically ponderous and overly dramatic numbers [...] but it lacks the commercial edge of previous singles".

A-ha played the song at Oslo Spektrum on 21 August 2011, performing for a national memorial service dedicated to the victims of the 2011 Norway attacks.

Music video
The music video accompanying the song's release was directed by Andy Morahan, with its location footage filmed on England's East Anglia coast at Aldeburgh, Suffolk.

Track listings
7-inch single: Warner Bros. / W 7936 United Kingdom
 "Stay on These Roads" - 4:46
 "Soft Rains of April" (Original Mix) - 3:18
 Track 1 is the "Album Version".

12-inch single: Warner Bros. / W 7936T United Kingdom
 "Stay on These Roads" (Extended Remix) - 6:08
 "Soft Rains of April" (Original Mix) - 3:18
 Also released as a 12" picture disc (W 8405TP)

7-inch single: Warner Bros. / 7-27886 United States
 "Stay on These Roads" (U.S. 7'' Edit) - 3:54
 "You'll End Up Crying - 3:18
 Track 1 is exclusive to this version

CD single: Warner Bros. / W 7936CD United Kingdom
 "Stay on These Roads" (7" version) - 4:46
 "Soft Rains of April" (Original Mix) - 3:18
 "Take on Me" - 3:50
 "Cry Wolf" - 4:05

Charts

Weekly charts

Year-end charts

Certifications

MTV Unplugged appearance 
In 2017, A-ha appeared on the television series MTV Unplugged and played and recorded acoustic versions of many of their popular songs for the album MTV Unplugged – Summer Solstice in Giske, Norway, including "Stay on These Roads".

References

1988 singles
1988 songs
A-ha songs
Music videos directed by Andy Morahan
Number-one singles in Denmark
Number-one singles in Norway
Song recordings produced by Alan Tarney
Songs written by Magne Furuholmen
Songs written by Morten Harket
Songs written by Paul Waaktaar-Savoy
Warner Records singles